Lanigan Airport  is located  east of Lanigan, Saskatchewan, Canada.

See also 
List of airports in Saskatchewan

References 

Registered aerodromes in Saskatchewan
Usborne No. 310, Saskatchewan